Malakand Division is an administrative division of Khyber Pakhtunkhwa province of Pakistan. It contains the following districts:

Districts 
 Bajaur District
 Buner District
 Central Dir District
 Upper Chitral District
 Lower Chitral District
 Lower Dir District
 Upper Dir District
 Malakand District
 Shangla District
 Swat District

History 
Until 1970 the area was known as the Malakand Agency. In 1970, Malakand Division was formed from the princely states of Chitral, Dir and Swat (incorporated into West Pakistan in 1969) and an area around the Malakand Fort known as the Malakand Protected Area. The capital of Malakand Division is Saidu Sharif, with the largest city being Mingora. In late 2018, former Chitral District was bifurcated into Upper Chitral District, from Mastuj Tehsil, and Lower Chitral District, from Chitral Tehsil.

New Division 
On December 2021 Chief Minister Mahmood Khan announced that Malakand Division would be divided into two separate divisions in order to improve the services and to facilitate the people. the proposed name for the new division is "Dir or Panjkora" division.

References 

Divisions of Khyber Pakhtunkhwa
History of Khyber Pakhtunkhwa